The discography of the band Jesu consists of eighteen official releases. This includes four full-length albums, two compilation albums, seven EPs, and three split albums. An additional EP, a remixed album, and a single were released under the moniker Pale Sketcher. Jesu is a post-metal band formed in 2003 by Justin Broadrick following the breakup of Godflesh. In March, 2010, Broadrick announced that he felt Jesu had strayed further away from the guitar driven music that he had intended, and more into electronica. As a resolution, although Jesu would still contain electronic elements, it would return to a guitar driven sound while the Pale Sketcher project would allow Broadrick to explore the electronica oriented sound further without interfering with Jesu.

Albums

Studio albums

Extended plays

Split EPs

Collections

Collaborations

Singles

Cover songs

Pale Sketcher albums

Other appearances
WTUL Songs From The Basement Volume Four - "Your Path To Divinity (WTUL Remix)" exclusive remix track; compilation album (2006) 
Metal Swim - "Dethroned"; Adult Swim compilation album (2010)
The Space Project - "Song of Earth" exclusive track; Record Store Day compilation release by Lefse Records (2014)
Say Yes! - "Condor Ave." exclusive track by Jesu & Sun Kil Moon; compilation album release American Laundromat Records (2016)
30 Days, 30 Songs - "The Greatest Conversation Ever in the History of the Universe" compilation contribution by Jesu & Sun Kil Moon (2016)

Music Videos
"Homesick" (2013)

References

External links
 Official website
 Official Myspace profile
 In The Flesh (no updates since 2007)
 Fan Site/Detailed Discography
 
 Jesu at Encyclopaedia Metallum
 
Jesu at lambgoat.com

Jesu (band) albums
Heavy metal group discographies
Discographies of British artists